Kent Persson (born 1951) is a Swedish politician of the Left Party. He was member of the Riksdag from 2006 to 2014.

External links 
Riksdagen: Kent Persson (v)

Members of the Riksdag from the Left Party (Sweden)
Living people
1951 births
Members of the Riksdag 2006–2010
Members of the Riksdag 2010–2014
21st-century Swedish politicians